Manuela Andrea Berrío Zuluaga (born 18 June 2000) is a Colombian weightlifter. She is a two-time medalist at the World Weightlifting Championships (silver in 2021 and bronze in 2022). She is also a gold medalist at the 2019 Pan American Weightlifting Championships and a two-time gold medalist at the 2022 Bolivarian Games.

Career 

She won the gold medal in the women's 44kg event at the 2016 Youth World Weightlifting Championships held in Penang, Malaysia.

She won the gold medal in the women's 45kg event at the 2019 Pan American Weightlifting Championships held in Guatemala City, Guatemala. In 2021, she won the bronze medal in the women's 49kg event at the 2020 Pan American Weightlifting Championships held in Santo Domingo, Dominican Republic.

She won the silver medal in the women's 45kg event at the 2021 World Weightlifting Championships held in Tashkent, Uzbekistan. She won the bronze medal in the women's 45kg event at the 2022 World Weightlifting Championships held in Bogotá, Colombia.

Achievements

References

External links 
 

Living people
2000 births
Place of birth missing (living people)
Colombian female weightlifters
Pan American Weightlifting Championships medalists
World Weightlifting Championships medalists
21st-century Colombian women
People from Palmira, Valle del Cauca
Sportspeople from Valle del Cauca Department